The Wheat Ridge Transcript Newspaper is a weekly newspaper that serves the community of Wheat Ridge, Colorado. The newspaper is owned by Mile high newspapers.  Originally the Jefferson County Transcript, it has been published since 1982.

External links 
 Official website

References 

Newspapers published in Colorado
Weekly newspapers published in the United States
Wheat Ridge, Colorado